Shahzodbek Nurmatov (born 18 September 1991) is an Uzbek footballer who plays as a forward for FC AGMK in the Uzbekistan Super League.

Career
Before joining Metallurg Bekabad in 2011 Nurmatov played for FK Dinamo Samarqand. He was one of the leading players and top scorers of Metallurg in the recent seasons. On 14 September 2013 he made hat-trick in match Metallurg – FK Guliston with scoreline 5:3. In 2013–2015 seasons he was consistently  the best club goalscorer, scoring 9, 8 goals and 10 goals for Metallurg.
 
On 2 January 2015 it was announced that Nurmatov had moved to Bunyodkor.

International
He made official debut for the national team on 20 August 2014 in Baku in a friendly match against Azerbaijan which ended draw 0-0.

Career statistics

Club

References

External links

Shahzodbek Nurmatov- Eurosport Australia

Uzbekistani footballers
1991 births
Living people
FK Dinamo Samarqand players
FC Bunyodkor players
PFK Metallurg Bekabad players
FC AGMK players
Uzbekistan international footballers
Association football forwards
Footballers at the 2014 Asian Games
Uzbekistan Super League players
Asian Games competitors for Uzbekistan